The 1997 Dwars door België was the 52nd edition of the Dwars door Vlaanderen cycle race and was held on 26 March 1997. The race started and finished in Waregem. The race was won by Andrei Tchmil.

General classification

References

1997
1997 in road cycling
1997 in Belgian sport
March 1997 sports events in Europe